Cheesecake Casserole is a 2012 American comedy-drama film directed by Renji Philip and written by Philip and Jamie Stein. The film stars Torrey DeVitto, Brit Morgan, Paige Howard, Ryan Merriman, Louis Herthum and Mark Kiely. The film focuses on the relationships between four best friends, who get together for a final celebration before graduating from college.

Plot 

The film tells the story of four young best friends, who spend their last weekend together before graduating from college. Their girls' weekend is soon interrupted when the boys crash the party. The girls notice that a lot of things have changed since they were freshman roommates at college and secrets start to come out. Four friends eventually have to face challenges of career, marriage, jealousy, lost love, mother's suicide and letting love in.

The film's official trailer introduces the girls as the "sexy one (Margo), the "faithful" one (Jess), the "sensitive" one (Avy) and the "lost" one (Cal).

Cast 
 Torrey DeVitto as Margo
 Brit Morgan as Cal
 Paige Howard as Jess
 Rome Brooks as Avy
 Ryan Merriman as Andy
 Louis Herthum as Howard
 Mark Kiely as Eric D

Production 

The film was shot in two weeks in Los Angeles. The film was mostly shot in one location, because the film's plot revolved around a final celebration of four college girls.

Jamie Stein, who produced and co-wrote the feature-length film, said that all actresses in the film mentioned that "they were drawn to our project specifically because it gave them the rare opportunity to play interesting characters with complete dramatic arcs." 

The film was marketed through social media campaigns on Facebook and Tumblr.

Reception 
Mr.media wrote of the film: "Each has a tangled narrative and, for Paige Howard’s Jess, there is something emotionally fraught bubbling beneath the surface of the beautiful redhead. Cheesecake Casserole might as well be called 'Four Chicks and a DB' – that’s “Douchebag” –because one of the girls has been followed to the getaway by her boyfriend Rudy, played by Rocco Nugent."

Release 
Cheesecake Casserole was released in 50 million homes across the United States via iTunes, Amazon, and on-demand cable channels on July 3, 2012. The film's DVD, with exclusive special features such as a blooper reel, cast interviews and deleted scenes, is sold on Amazon.
The film became available on video streaming service Netflix in February 2013.

References

External links 
 
 

American comedy-drama films
2012 comedy-drama films
Films about fraternities and sororities
Films about fashion
Films about friendship
2012 films
2012 directorial debut films
2010s English-language films
2010s American films